Papyrus Oxyrhynchus 291 (P. Oxy. 291 or P. Oxy. II 291) is a fragment of a Letter of a Strategus, in Greek. It was discovered in Oxyrhynchus. The manuscript was written on papyrus in the form of a sheet. It was written between 25–26. Currently it is housed in the British Library (Department of Manuscripts 800) in London.

Description 
The measurements of the fragment are 230 by 150 mm. The document is mutilated.

The document was written by Chaereas and was addressed to Tyrannus. It contains a Letter of a Strategus, with a reference to certain details of financial administration.

The text is written in a fine, bold, semi-uncial hand, with an unusual tendency to separation of words. P.Oxy 292 is of the same handwriting. Probably it was written by a professional scribe attached to the strategus.

This papyrus was discovered by Grenfell and Hunt in 1897 in Oxyrhynchus. The text was published by Grenfell and Hunt in 1899.

See also 
 Oxyrhynchus Papyri

References 

291
1st-century manuscripts
British Library collections